Gabriel Diallo (born 24 September 2001) is a Canadian tennis player.

Diallo has a career-high ATP singles ranking of World No. 211, achieved on 6 February 2023. He is playing in his senior year at the University of Kentucky.

Career

2022: Maiden Challenger title, ATP & top 250 debut, Davis Cup champion
In August, he made his ATP debut in the qualifying competition as a wildcard at the 2022 National Bank Open in Montreal where he defeated James Duckworth in the first round.

Participating in a tournament also with a wildcard entry, Diallo won 5 consecutive matches to claim his maiden title at the 2022 Granby Challenger in only his fourth main-draw Challenger-level tournament. The 20-year-old was the youngest Canadian champion on the Challenger Tour since Felix Auger-Aliassime won the Tashkent Challenger in 2018. As a result he rose to a career-high No. 335 in the ATP Rankings.

He finished the year at a career-high ranking of No. 224 on 21 November 2022.

ATP Challenger and ITF Futures finals

Singles: 5 (2–3)

Doubles: 1 (0–1)

National and international representation

Team competitions finals: 1 (1 title)

References

External links
 
 
 

2001 births
Living people
Canadian male tennis players
Tennis players from Montreal
Kentucky Wildcats men's tennis players
21st-century Canadian people